The Eastern constituency (No.211) is a Russian legislative constituency in Saint Petersburg. The constituency was initially created in 1995 from parts of North East and South East constituencies and was based in eastern Saint Petersburg. The constituency was significantly altered in 2016 as nearly all of former Eastern constituency was placed into reestablished North Eastern constituency, while new Eastern constituency is based in Nevsky District, which has been taken from Southern constituency.

Members elected

1995

|-
! colspan=2 style="background-color:#E9E9E9;text-align:left;vertical-align:top;" |Candidate
! style="background-color:#E9E9E9;text-align:left;vertical-align:top;" |Party
! style="background-color:#E9E9E9;text-align:right;" |Votes
! style="background-color:#E9E9E9;text-align:right;" |%
|-
|style="background-color:"|
|align=left|Yury Nesterov
|align=left|Yabloko
|
|17.27%
|-
|style="background-color:"|
|align=left|Konstantin Serov
|align=left|Independent
|
|8.55%
|-
|style="background-color:"|
|align=left|Pyotr Glushchenko
|align=left|Communist Party
|
|7.96%
|-
|style="background-color:#1A1A1A"|
|align=left|Vladimir Serdyukov
|align=left|Stanislav Govorukhin Bloc
|
|7.93%
|-
|style="background-color:"|
|align=left|Dmitry Rozhdestvensky
|align=left|Independent
|
|6.39%
|-
|style="background-color:"|
|align=left|Yury Belyayev
|align=left|Independent
|
|5.27%
|-
|style="background-color:#D50000"|
|align=left|Sergey Vakulov
|align=left|Communists and Working Russia - for the Soviet Union
|
|4.45%
|-
|style="background-color:"|
|align=left|Sergey Vymenets
|align=left|Independent
|
|4.32%
|-
|style="background-color:"|
|align=left|Vladimir Luchkevich
|align=left|Independent
|
|4.02%
|-
|style="background-color:#2C299A"|
|align=left|Mikhail Pirogov
|align=left|Congress of Russian Communities
|
|3.92%
|-
|style="background-color:#1C1A0D"|
|align=left|Valery Andreyev
|align=left|Forward, Russia!
|
|2.74%
|-
|style="background-color:#FF4400"|
|align=left|Anatoly Pshenichnikov
|align=left|Party of Workers' Self-Government
|
|2.46%
|-
|style="background-color:"|
|align=left|Mikhail Ivanov
|align=left|Liberal Democratic Party
|
|2.28%
|-
|style="background-color:"|
|align=left|Aleksandr Trafimov
|align=left|Agrarian Party
|
|1.75%
|-
|style="background-color:"|
|align=left|Aleksey Chernetsov
|align=left|Independent
|
|1.52%
|-
|style="background-color:"|
|align=left|Nikolay Golubev
|align=left|Independent
|
|1.31%
|-
|style="background-color:"|
|align=left|Vitaly Rystov
|align=left|Independent
|
|1.15%
|-
|style="background-color:"|
|align=left|Shukhrat Sayfullayev
|align=left|Independent
|
|0.94%
|-
|style="background-color:"|
|align=left|Aleksey Motorin
|align=left|Independent
|
|0.78%
|-
|style="background-color:"|
|align=left|Aleksey Zelenkov
|align=left|Independent
|
|0.69%
|-
|style="background-color:#000000"|
|colspan=2 |against all
|
|11.59%
|-
| colspan="5" style="background-color:#E9E9E9;"|
|- style="font-weight:bold"
| colspan="3" style="text-align:left;" | Total
| 
| 100%
|-
| colspan="5" style="background-color:#E9E9E9;"|
|- style="font-weight:bold"
| colspan="4" |Source:
|
|}

1999

|-
! colspan=2 style="background-color:#E9E9E9;text-align:left;vertical-align:top;" |Candidate
! style="background-color:#E9E9E9;text-align:left;vertical-align:top;" |Party
! style="background-color:#E9E9E9;text-align:right;" |Votes
! style="background-color:#E9E9E9;text-align:right;" |%
|-
|style="background-color:#1042A5"|
|align=left|Irina Khakamada
|align=left|Union of Right Forces
|
|23.49%
|-
|style="background-color:#C21022"|
|align=left|Aleksandr Morozov
|align=left|Party of Pensioners
|
|16.89%
|-
|style="background-color:"|
|align=left|Stepan Shabanov
|align=left|Communist Party
|
|12.11%
|-
|style="background-color:"|
|align=left|Yury Nesterov (incumbent)
|align=left|Yabloko
|
|9.41%
|-
|style="background-color:"|
|align=left|Vladimir Serdyukov
|align=left|Independent
|
|6.24%
|-
|style="background-color:"|
|align=left|Igor Vysotsky
|align=left|Independent
|
|3.79%
|-
|style="background-color:"|
|align=left|Yevgeny Kozlov
|align=left|Independent
|
|2.87%
|-
|style="background-color:"|
|align=left|Lyudmila Smirnova
|align=left|Liberal Democratic Party
|
|2.78%
|-
|style="background-color:#020266"|
|align=left|Sergey Kovalev
|align=left|Russian Socialist Party
|
|2.09%
|-
|style="background-color:"|
|align=left|Valentin Kovalevsky
|align=left|Independent
|
|1.80%
|-
|style="background-color:#084284"|
|align=left|Ilya Konstantinov
|align=left|Spiritual Heritage
|
|0.95%
|-
|style="background-color:"|
|align=left|Oleg Yerokhov
|align=left|Independent
|
|0.49%
|-
|style="background-color:#000000"|
|colspan=2 |against all
|
|15.69%
|-
| colspan="5" style="background-color:#E9E9E9;"|
|- style="font-weight:bold"
| colspan="3" style="text-align:left;" | Total
| 
| 100%
|-
| colspan="5" style="background-color:#E9E9E9;"|
|- style="font-weight:bold"
| colspan="4" |Source:
|
|}

2003
A by-election was scheduled after Against all line received the most votes.

|-
! colspan=2 style="background-color:#E9E9E9;text-align:left;vertical-align:top;" |Candidate
! style="background-color:#E9E9E9;text-align:left;vertical-align:top;" |Party
! style="background-color:#E9E9E9;text-align:right;" |Votes
! style="background-color:#E9E9E9;text-align:right;" |%
|-
|style="background-color:"|
|align=left|Irina Rodnina
|align=left|United Russia
|
|21.84%
|-
|style="background-color:#1042A5"|
|align=left|Grigory Tomchin
|align=left|Union of Right Forces
|
|16.90%
|-
|style="background-color:"|
|align=left|Yury Gatchin
|align=left|Communist Party
|
|8.69%
|-
|style="background-color:"|
|align=left|Andrey Ananov
|align=left|Independent
|
|8.25%
|-
|style="background-color:"|
|align=left|Valentin Nikolsky
|align=left|Independent
|
|7.17%
|-
|style="background-color:"|
|align=left|Aleksandr Koltsov
|align=left|Liberal Democratic Party
|
|3.95%
|-
|style="background-color:#7C73CC"|
|align=left|Nadezhda Shumeyko
|align=left|Great Russia – Eurasian Union
|
|3.14%
|-
|style="background-color:"|
|align=left|Nikolay Bondarik
|align=left|Independent
|
|2.25%
|-
|style="background-color:#FFD700"|
|align=left|Aleksandr Yegorov
|align=left|People's Party
|
|2.06%
|-
|style="background-color:#000000"|
|colspan=2 |against all
|
|23.93%
|-
| colspan="5" style="background-color:#E9E9E9;"|
|- style="font-weight:bold"
| colspan="3" style="text-align:left;" | Total
| 
| 100%
|-
| colspan="5" style="background-color:#E9E9E9;"|
|- style="font-weight:bold"
| colspan="4" |Source:
|
|}

2004

|-
! colspan=2 style="background-color:#E9E9E9;text-align:left;vertical-align:top;" |Candidate
! style="background-color:#E9E9E9;text-align:left;vertical-align:top;" |Party
! style="background-color:#E9E9E9;text-align:right;" |Votes
! style="background-color:#E9E9E9;text-align:right;" |%
|-
|style="background-color:"|
|align=left|Aleksandr Morozov
|align=left|Independent
|
|23.56%
|-
|style="background-color:"|
|align=left|Anna Markova
|align=left|Independent
|
|18.26%
|-
|style="background-color:"|
|align=left|Sergey Andreyev
|align=left|Independent
|
|14.65%
|-
|style="background-color:"|
|align=left|Grigory Tomchin
|align=left|Independent
|
|10.91%
|-
|style="background-color:"|
|align=left|Yury Gatchin
|align=left|Communist Party
|
|2.42%
|-
|style="background-color:"|
|align=left|Inna Safronova
|align=left|Independent
|
|1.82%
|-
|style="background-color:"|
|align=left|Andrey Yelchaninov
|align=left|Independent
|
|1.51%
|-
|style="background-color:#D50000"|
|align=left|Gennady Turetsky
|align=left|Russian Communist Workers Party-Russian Party of Communists
|
|1.42%
|-
|style="background-color:"|
|align=left|Sergey Tikhomirov
|align=left|Liberal Democratic Party
|
|1.40%
|-
|style="background-color:"|
|align=left|Oleg Prosypkin
|align=left|Rodina
|
|1.18%
|-
|style="background-color:"|
|align=left|Elvira Sharova
|align=left|Independent
|
|0.61%
|-
|style="background-color:#000000"|
|colspan=2 |against all
|
|20.41%
|-
| colspan="5" style="background-color:#E9E9E9;"|
|- style="font-weight:bold"
| colspan="3" style="text-align:left;" | Total
| 
| 100%
|-
| colspan="5" style="background-color:#E9E9E9;"|
|- style="font-weight:bold"
| colspan="4" |Source:
|
|}

2016

|-
! colspan=2 style="background-color:#E9E9E9;text-align:left;vertical-align:top;" |Candidate
! style="background-color:#E9E9E9;text-align:leftt;vertical-align:top;" |Party
! style="background-color:#E9E9E9;text-align:right;" |Votes
! style="background-color:#E9E9E9;text-align:right;" |%
|-
| style="background-color: " |
|align=left|Igor Divinsky
|align=left|United Russia
|
|35.67%
|-
|style="background:"| 
|align=left|Vladislav Bakulin
|align=left|Party of Growth
|
|11.42%
|-
|style="background-color:"|
|align=left|Viktor Lozhechko
|align=left|A Just Russia
|
|8.92%
|-
|style="background:"| 
|align=left|Mikhail Stupakov
|align=left|Yabloko
|
|8.91%
|-
|style="background-color:"|
|align=left|Sergey Kozhanchi
|align=left|Liberal Democratic Party
|
|8.70%
|-
|style="background-color:"|
|align=left|Olga Khodunova
|align=left|Communist Party
|
|8.38%
|-
|style="background:"| 
|align=left|Irina Melnikova
|align=left|People's Freedom Party
|
|5.32%
|-
|style="background:"| 
|align=left|Yury Savin
|align=left|Communists of Russia
|
|3.66%
|-
|style="background:"| 
|align=left|Andrey Ivanov
|align=left|Rodina
|
|3.55%
|-
|style="background-color:"|
|align=left|Konstantin Lavrinyuk
|align=left|Patriots of Russia
|
|1.03%
|-
|style="background:"| 
|align=left|Mikhail Koyfman
|align=left|Civic Platform
|
|0.72%
|-
| colspan="5" style="background-color:#E9E9E9;"|
|- style="font-weight:bold"
| colspan="3" style="text-align:left;" | Total
| 
| 100%
|-
| colspan="5" style="background-color:#E9E9E9;"|
|- style="font-weight:bold"
| colspan="4" |Source:
|
|}

2021

|-
! colspan=2 style="background-color:#E9E9E9;text-align:left;vertical-align:top;" |Candidate
! style="background-color:#E9E9E9;text-align:left;vertical-align:top;" |Party
! style="background-color:#E9E9E9;text-align:right;" |Votes
! style="background-color:#E9E9E9;text-align:right;" |%
|-
|style="background-color: " |
|align=left|Mikhail Romanov
|align=left|United Russia
|
|37.61%
|-
|style="background-color:"|
|align=left|Olga Khodunova
|align=left|Communist Party
|
|18.63%
|-
|style="background-color:"|
|align=left|Viktor Lozhechko
|align=left|A Just Russia — For Truth
|
|9.86%
|-
|style="background-color: "|
|align=left|Ksenia Goryacheva
|align=left|New People
|
|6.52%
|-
|style="background-color: "|
|align=left|Vladislav Bakulin
|align=left|Party of Growth
|
|6.32%
|-
|style="background-color: "|
|align=left|Maksim Gogolin
|align=left|Party of Pensioners
|
|4.11%
|-
|style="background-color:"|
|align=left|Maksim Stetsura
|align=left|Liberal Democratic Party
|
|3.70%
|-
|style="background-color:"|
|align=left|Nikita Sorokin
|align=left|Yabloko
|
|3.61%
|-
|style="background-color:"|
|align=left|Asya Borzova
|align=left|The Greens
|
|2.85%
|-
|style="background-color:"|
|align=left|Nina Abrosova
|align=left|Rodina
|
|1.89%
|-
|style="background:"| 
|align=left|Ilona Khanina
|align=left|Civic Platform
|
|0.78%
|-
| colspan="5" style="background-color:#E9E9E9;"|
|- style="font-weight:bold"
| colspan="3" style="text-align:left;" | Total
| 
| 100%
|-
| colspan="5" style="background-color:#E9E9E9;"|
|- style="font-weight:bold"
| colspan="4" |Source:
|
|}

Notes

References

Russian legislative constituencies
Politics of Saint Petersburg